Albeni Falls Dam is located on the Pend Oreille River between Oldtown, Idaho, and Priest River, Idaho. It is located on the site of a natural waterfall named Albeni Falls, named after early pioneer Albeni Poirier.

Construction on the dam began in 1951 and was completed in 1955 at a cost of $34 million ($261 million in 2007 dollars). It produces over 200 million kilowatt hours of electricity each year for the Bonneville Power Administration and is operated by the U.S. Army Corps of Engineers.

See also
List of dams in the Columbia River watershed

References

External links 
 U.S. Army Corps of Engineers, Albeni Falls Dam
 

Dams in Idaho
Dams on the Pend Oreille River
Buildings and structures in Bonner County, Idaho
Gravity dams
Dams completed in 1955
United States Army Corps of Engineers dams
1955 establishments in Idaho